Richard Bong State Recreation Area is a  unit of the state park system of the U.S. state of Wisconsin. It is located in the town of Brighton, in Kenosha County. This managed prairie contains  of mountain bike trails. Other recreational activities include high power rocketry, swimming, dogsledding, falconry, ATV sports, land sailing, horseback riding, hunting, fishing, camping with amenities, and ultralight aviation. There is a wildlife preserve where great egrets, sandhill cranes, and great blue herons are known to nest. The Richard Bong SRA is one of the centerpieces of the proposed Hackmatack National Wildlife Refuge.

Richard Bong Air Force Base
The park is on land once intended for the Richard Bong Air Force Base, whose namesake is World War II veteran aviator Maj. Richard Ira Bong. Part of what was intended to be the  main airstrip is still visible from aerial photos of the site.

Theft of signs

Largely due to its name's coincidental allusions to marijuana use, Bong Recreation Area is a frequent target of sign theft.  This has led to the manufacturing of T-shirts and sweatshirts bearing the highway exit sign.

References

External links

Richard Bong State Recreation Area

Protected areas of Kenosha County, Wisconsin
Prairies
Protected areas established in 1963
State parks of Wisconsin
Nature centers in Wisconsin